Christopher John Riley (born 19 January 1939 in Rhyl, north Wales - died in 1983) was a Welsh professional football player who played as a forward for Crewe Alexandra in the late 1950s and early 1960s.

Signed from Rhyl in March 1958, aged 19, he made his debut and scored his first goal for Crewe in a 3–1 defeat at Bradford Park Avenue on 15 March 1958. He played 155 league and cup matches for Crewe, scoring 49 goals, before moving, after an unsuccessful trial at Tranmere Rovers, to Witton Albion in 1964.

From Witton Albion, he then moved to Ellesmere Port Town and Bedford Town. He played while also a serving RAF officer, captaining the RAF football XI, and also played Minor Counties cricket for Flintshire and Denbighshire.

References

1939 births
1983 deaths
Sportspeople from Rhyl
Rhyl F.C. players
Crewe Alexandra F.C. players
Bedford Town F.C. players
Welsh cricketers
Welsh footballers
Association football forwards